Alice Maud Olivia Stanley, Countess of Derby (née Montagu; 15 August 1862, Westminster – 23 July 1957, Coworth Park) was born the daughter of the 7th Duke of Manchester and his wife, Countess Louise von Alten.

Marriage
On 5 January 1889, she married Lord Stanley of Bickerstaffe. Lord Stanley succeeded to his father's title of Earl of Derby in 1908, whereupon she became Countess of Derby. They had two sons and one daughter, all of whom she outlived. From 1901 to 1910, Alice was a Lady of the Bedchamber to Queen Alexandra.

In August 1901, Lady Stanley named the battleship HMS Exmouth, built by Cammell Laird at Birkenhead. In April 1913, the Countess also had the honor of christening the newest and largest Cunard Company steamship, the RMS Aquitania, at Clydebank, Scotland.

References

1862 births
1957 deaths
People from Westminster
Alice Stanley, Countess of Derby
English countesses
Daughters of British dukes
Ladies of the Bedchamber
Alice Montagu
Wives of knights